Susan Elizabeth Whelan,  (born May 5, 1963 in Windsor, Ontario) is a former Canadian Member of Parliament with the Liberal Party of Canada.  Whelan, a lawyer, first won a seat in the House of Commons of Canada in the 1993 election representing Essex—Windsor.  In 1997 and 2000 she was elected to represent Essex.  In 2002, Whelan was appointed by Prime Minister Jean Chrétien as Minister for International Cooperation as a cabinet minister.

Whelan was defeated by Conservative Jeff Watson at the 2004 election, and unsuccessfully tried to win back her old seat in 2006 and the 2008.

Susan Whelan is the daughter of former Liberal Federal Minister of Agriculture, the Honourable Eugene Whelan.  Susan and her father hold the distinction of being the first father-daughter cabinet appointees.

Whelan shares her father's passionate interest in Canadian agriculture, having made Agriculture and Rural Development one of the key elements of policy during her tenure as Minister.

She has also instructed part-time at the University of Windsor, appropriately situated in the political science department.

She previously represented the Ambassador Bridge Company on the Green Corridor Project.

In June 2009, Whelan was named Chief Executive Officer for the Ontario division of the Canadian Cancer Society. In August the same year, she was diagnosed with breast cancer.
She resigned from the Canadian Cancer Society in order to focus on her recovery.

Whelan authors a blog entitled Susan's Fight Back, to share her experience, strength, and hope with others.

Whelan is currently the Executive Director of rare Charitable Research Reserve in Cambridge, Ontario  and maintains a law practice in Windsor, Ontario.

Electoral record

References 

1963 births
Women government ministers of Canada
Women members of the House of Commons of Canada
Liberal Party of Canada MPs
Living people
Members of the 26th Canadian Ministry
Members of the House of Commons of Canada from Ontario
Members of the King's Privy Council for Canada
Politicians from Windsor, Ontario
Women in Ontario politics
21st-century Canadian women politicians
20th-century Canadian women politicians